Habibur Rahman Dayal is a Bangladesh Nationalist Party politician and a Member of Parliament from Kishoreganj-2.

Career
Dayal was elected to parliament from Kishoreganj-2 as an Bangladesh Nationalist Party candidate in February 1996.

References

Bangladesh Nationalist Party politicians
Date of birth missing (living people)
6th Jatiya Sangsad members